Woodham Ferrers and Bicknacre is a civil parish in the Chelmsford district in Essex, England. The parish includes the villages of Bicknacre and Woodham Ferrers. In 2011 the civil parish had a population of 2,889.

References

Civil parishes in Essex
City of Chelmsford